The Doughnut Formation is an Upper Mississippian geologic unit in the western United States. Fish fossils have been discovered in shale outcrops of this formation in Dinosaur National Monument.

Footnotes

References
 Hunt, ReBecca K., Vincent L. Santucci and Jason Kenworthy. 2006. "A preliminary inventory of fossil fish from National Park Service units." in S.G. Lucas, J.A. Spielmann, P.M. Hester, J.P. Kenworthy, and V.L. Santucci (ed.s), Fossils from Federal Lands. New Mexico Museum of Natural History and Science Bulletin 34, pp. 63–69.

Geologic formations of Colorado
Geologic formations of Utah
Dinosaur National Monument